Sirimal Wijesinghe is a Sri Lankan author, political analyst, film director, journalist, alternative intellectual, and leader of the Poor People's Party in Sri Lanka. critic and activist. He is the founding editor of the controversial Sinhala youth magazine, Paradisaya. He is one of the pioneers of the new wave of Colombo-based young political and cultural analysts who emerged in the decade of 1980, particularly after the advent of the open economic system. Wijesinghe's contribution in various fields, ranging from politics to arts, has been considered experimental as well as path-breaking.

Politics

Wijesinghe has been known for his upright stance on supporting fundamental rights of the minority Tamils in Sri Lanka.

He has often voiced his opinion, against a vehemently traditionalistic and nationalistic backdrop, on issues such as sexual freedom, homosexual rights, legalisation of abortion and prostitution as well as the right of the individuals to commit suicide.

His contribution in the political sphere was deeply felt during the period of 1980–1990 when the Sri Lankan youth were seeking an alternative to the open economic system due to its emerging harmful effects on society as a whole.

The post-Marxist and postmodern political theories which Wijesinghe propagated that time became a seminal force in the emergence of various political movements, including the later divisions of the leftist political party, Janatha Vimukthi Peramuna (JVP).

When the local nationalistic forces staged a fierce protest over the Indo-Lanka Peace Accord in 1987, introduced by the United National Party government as a solution to the ethnic crisis, Wijesinghe survived that fierce attack targeted mainly on Tamil sympathisers. Yet, after the government forces counterattacked those nationalistic forces with a ruthless military operative, Wijesinghe was in the forefront of the struggle to protect their human rights.

Wijesinghe was an active member of the Classical Marxist organisation Vikosa. His writings in the bilingual periodical Pravada published in the early 1990s by the Social Scientists' Association of Sri Lanka, headed by Charles Abeysekera, were among the first few such works based on the political and cultural thoughts like neo Marxism, existentialism and post-structuralism.

Wijesinghe was one of the first few advocates of the positive social effects of popular culture. Propelled by an unexpected theoretical backing by the mainstream sociologist Dr. Sarath Amunugama in the late 1980s, the popular culture debate gathered momentum in Sri Lanka and, by the mid 1990s, attained a seemingly discursive triumph; hence Wijesinghe is sometimes hailed as an unsung cultural hero of the times.

Wijesinghe, with journalist/modern thinker Prageeth Eknaligoda, formed The Council of Alternative Intellectuals, a pressure group established for the purpose of providing a fresh ideological contribution to the Opposition of the Sri Lankan government. But the project had to be abandoned in its early stages, in 2010, as Eknaligoda was allegedly abducted by pro government forces. Eknaligoda is still considered to have gone missing and various local and international media rights organisations complain the present Sri Lankan government for his abduction.

He is leader of the Poor People's Party in Sri Lanka which was founded in 2012.

Journalism
Wijesinghe has been an editor of numerous newspapers and periodicals in Sri Lanka for the last 30 years. He is often known for presenting controversial feature articles and social and cultural analyses.

His topics have ranged from politics, arts, culture and sexuality, presented in a more colloquial language comprising satire. Well-known social scientist Prof. Jayadewa Uyangoda once said he learnt to use a different and more effective writing style after reading Wijesinghe's articles.

Paaraadeesaya magazine
1990s popular sociocultural magazine Paradisaya (Paradise) was a brainchild of Sirimal Wijesinghe. Founded on 25 November 1998, Paradisaya became a huge success. Its controversial style and content caused controversy in the country. The magazine reflected Sirimal's steadfastness towards alternate youth politics – human rights, minority rights and sexual autonomy was explicit in his social mediation in Sri Lanka's cultural politics after the 1980s.

A popular post-modernist theoretician in Sri Lanka and the leader of the Sri Lanka Vanguard Party, Deepthi Kumara Gunaratne has said Wijesinghe who is first Politics teacher of me broke many existing social and cultural shackles when he edited Paradeesaya. Gunaratne has added: "Sirimal bravely discussed the subject of sexuality which had been vehemently suppressed in the mainstream media that time. Understandably, the following generation followed in his footsteps and brought sexual themes openly to the media. Sirimal can be considered one of the most pioneers in our journalism."

The page layout style he followed in publishing Paradeesaya later became a yardstick for various tabloids.

Despite huge popularity, the publication of Paradeesaya was stopped in 2000 by a court order.

Author

In 1993, Wijesinghe wrote Sooriyakande abirahas malaminee (the mysterious dead bodies in Sooriyakanda Mountain), an investigative book on the gory killing of 32 innocent schoolchildren in Sooriyakanda during the 1987–1989 second JVP insurrection.

The book revealed some of the names of the alleged killers and, as a result, he received death threats. He was later offered political asylum in Switzerland but he denied leaving Sri Lanka. The opposition political parties used contents of Wijesinghe's book in a successful political campaign during the period of 1993–1994.

In 1994, Wijesinghe received the award for the best short-story writer at the annual Independent Literary Festival (Vibhavi Academy of Fine Arts, Sri Lanka).

The illustrated book which he wrote in 1995 titled Practical Sexual Education which is not often found in the bookstalls due to various government restraints, is still manages to have a good selling.

The third book he wrote advocating Buddhist Tantra's as a method of healing psychological problems is now being translated into English under the name Secret of Samsar.

His latest book, titled Ecstasy Secrets; Subcultural Sex Practices to Try Before you Die has been published internationally by the Amazon Publishers in America.

2018 He was publish the Short Story book titled 'Obaama Mahathage Sthree Prashnaya'.

Filmography
In 2008, Wijesinghe directed the children's feature film Pitasakwala Kumarayai Pancho Hathai. There he experimented in presenting a novel children's theme in Sinhala cinema.

His next both of films are ‘Alchemist the Budda' and 'Here is the Rose – Dance Here' aimed at the international market, is now in the script developing stage. It is based on a theme of spiritual essence found in the Asian region and its combination with human love. It is to be dubbed in English, French and German languages. The films are scheduled to be shooting in Franc, Switzerland, Netherland, America, Egypt, Morocco, South Africa and India. It is expected to spend 2 million dollar on the two films.

Wijesinghe was also the dialogue writer of the award-winning Sinhala film Mille Soya directed by Boodee Keerthisena.

In 2011 he directed a 57-minute short film named Sri Lanka police shooting against workers based on a youngster who was killed in a worker protest at Katunayaka. The film was banned from public viewing.

In 2012, Wijesinghe directed another 34-minute short film Full stop to police torture on the invitation of the Asian Human Rights Commission. Rights Now in collaboration with Asia Human Right Commission, produced the film. It was directed by Sirimal Wijesinghe.

He was also the script writer of the 2010 documentary Lunatic Heaven which was based on the gruesome incident where police clubbed to death a mentally handicapped youth in Bambalapitiya in front of general public. Most of the crew who contributed to produce this documentary received death threats and had to flee the country and now living in Netherlands under the political asylum. (Artists for Human Rights in Sri Lanka)

He is also planning to direct a documentary on the fate of the Tamils after the end of the Sri Lanka civil war. Amid threats from various Sinhala chauvinist groups, he travelled in various European countries like France, Switzerland and Italy, to gather firsthand information, especially from the Tamil Diaspora, for his film.

In 2014 he was start the documentary film titled Cult Monk in Sri Lanka. Then extreme religious teams and religious police unit of the state threatened him also. The many media reported in that force.

Wijesinghe also comes in as an actor in the film How I Wonder What You Are directed by Chinthana Dharmadasa and Udaya Dharmawardhana.

Theatre
Wijesinghe has worked as a production assistant for nearly ten years mainly under two leading political stage drama directors in Sri Lanka, Sugathapala de Silva and Dharmasiri Bandaranayake.

He has produced several short dramas to coincide with the anniversaries of Sri Lanka's leftist political parties.

Advertising
Wijesinghe has been working in the field of advertising, both as a script writer and a creative director, for many years. Presently he works as the creative director of the Colombo Media Network.

References

External links
 Full Stop to Police Torture (Full Documentary) 
 Sri Lanka Police Shooting Against Workers (Full Documentary)

Sri Lankan film directors
Sri Lankan politicians
Sinhalese writers
Sri Lankan journalists
Living people
1963 births